Wrapped Up in Pinstripes is the third EP by Farewell, My Love, released on December 9, 2014 via StandBy Records. This is their first release with Chad Kowal on vocals instead of just drums. The EP is songs from previous releases re-recorded as acoustic and with Chad Kowal as vocals. The album was recorded between September and October 2014 with producers Dan Parker & Connor Hurley.

Track listing

References

External links
 Standbyrecords.net
 Amazon.com

Farewell, My Love (band) EPs
2014 EPs